Fossifrontia is a monotypic snout moth genus described by George Hampson in 1891. Its single species, Fossifrontia leuconeurella, is found in Queensland, Australia.

References

Anerastiini
Monotypic moth genera
Moths of Australia
Pyralidae genera
Taxa named by George Hampson